The Country of Marriage is a 1962 novel written by Jon Cleary. It concerns the marriage between Adam Nash and his wife Belle and their decision whether to leave England, where they have lived for seventeen years and raised two young children, and go back to Belle's country, Australia, where they had met during World War II.

Cleary wrote a number of screen versions of the novel but it has never been filmed.

References

External links
 1962 serialisation of novel in the Australian Women's Weekly
The Country of Marriage at AustLit (subscription required)

1952 Australian novels
Novels first published in serial form
William Collins, Sons books
William Morrow and Company books
Novels by Jon Cleary